Countess Danielle Vaughn (born August 8, 1978) is an American actress, singer and television personality. She is best known for her role as Kim Parker on the UPN sitcoms Moesha and its spin-off The Parkers, and as Alexandria DeWitt on 227.

Early life
Vaughn was born in Idabel, Oklahoma, to Sandra and Leo Vaughn. She began her performing career at age three in 1981, singing at church. At nine in 1988, she sang "I'll Be There" to win the Star Search junior vocalist champion and overall junior champion. Following that success, she was cast as Alexandria DeWitt in the fourth season of NBC sitcom, 227 at the start of its fourth season in 1988. Vaughn left the show the following year.

Career
In the 1990s, Vaughn guest starred on Thea, Hangin' with Mr. Cooper, and Roc. Outside of television, she performed in the off-Broadway musical Mama, I Want to Sing! Part 3. In 1992, Vaughn released her first album, Countess, featuring a variety of songs, including dance music and R&B. The album's lead single, a cover of James Brown's "It's A Man's, Man's, Man's World", charted in the top-100 of the Billboard R&B/Hip-Hop Songs chart; the album itself sold 3,000 copies.

Vaughn's breakthrough role was playing Kim Parker in the UPN sitcom Moesha. She co-starred on the show from 1996 to 1999. In 1998 Vaughn was honored with an NAACP Image Award for Outstanding Supporting Actress in a Comedy Series for her performance in Moesha. In 1999 Vaughn starred in and also sang the theme song for the show's spin-off The Parkers, opposite actress and comedian Mo'Nique. The series aired from 1999 until 2004. On film Vaughn co-starred in Trippin  (1999) and in later years guest starred on Cuts and Let's Stay Together.

Personal life
On January 16, 2002, Vaughn married Joseph James. The couple had a son before divorcing in 2005. Vaughn also has a daughter, born in 2009, with ex-fiancé David Whitten.

During an appearance on The Doctors, Vaughn revealed that she suffered from hair loss due to bad reactions from glue used on wigs she wore for many years. She also has discoloration on her skin in many places.

Reality television
In the mid-2000s, Vaughn began appearing in a number of reality shows. She appeared in the third season of Celebrity Fit Club which premiered in January 2006 on VH1. On episode four, she announced that she was going through a divorce. During the course of the show, she became the first cast member to ever gain weight. It was said on the season finale that she was simply trying to lose weight at the wrong time. She later appeared as a contestant on MTV's Celebrity Rap Superstar which surprisingly premiered August 30, 2007. She studied under Warren G for the show. On September 27, 2007, an illness caused her to be eliminated from the competition.

In 2014, Vaughn began starring in the TV One reality series Hollywood Divas, alongside Golden Brooks, Lisa Wu, and Paula Jai Parker. The series premiered on October 8, 2014. During the first season, Vaughn revealed that she had an abortion around the age of 18. She said that "I had an unwanted pregnancy. I had just started my TV show. I knew that in black Hollywood a girl having a baby, they’d get rid of you. I had to do something about it. I had to make a decision to get rid of a child for my career.".

Filmography

Discography

Studio albums
 Countess (1992)

Singles 

 It's A Man's, Man's, Man's World (1992)
 Wait For Me (1992) 
 Do You Love Him?/Wifey (2016)

References

External links

1978 births
20th-century American actresses
21st-century American actresses
Living people
Actresses from Oklahoma
20th-century African-American women singers
American child actresses
Participants in American reality television series
People from Idabel, Oklahoma
American television actresses
African-American actresses
American film actresses
21st-century American singers
21st-century American women singers
21st-century African-American women singers